Nancy Ornstein (born July 31, 1952) is an American former professional tennis player.

Ornstein grew up in the Washington D.C. area and was a Junior Orange Bowl champion. She competed on the international tour in the 1970s, featuring in the second rounds of both the French Open and Wimbledon.

References

External links
 
 

1952 births
Living people
American female tennis players
Jewish tennis players
Tennis players from Washington, D.C.